This is an overall list of statistics and records of the Dhangadhi Premier League, a Twenty20 cricket competition based in Nepal.

Listing notation 
Team notation
 (100-3) indicates that a team scored 100 runs for three wickets and the innings was closed,
either due to a successful run chase or if no overs remained (or are able) to be bowled.
 (100) indicates that a team scored 100 runs and was all out,
either by losing all ten wickets or by having one or more batsmen unable to bat and losing the remaining wickets.

Batting notation
 (100) indicates that a batsman scored 100 runs and was out.
 (100*) indicates that a batsman scored 100 runs and was not out.

Bowling notation
 (3-25) indicates that a bowler has captured 3 wickets while giving away 25 runs.

Currently playing
 Record holders who are currently in the recent team squad of the series/tournament are shown in bold.
Comparison

Team records

Team wins, losses, and ties

Matches played (by team)

Team scoring records  
(Records includes full 20-over matches only)

Highest innings totals

Lowest innings totals

Highest match aggregate

Highest successful run chases 

Source: Last Updated: 12-April-2018

Lowest scores defended 

Source: Last Updated:10-Apr-2018

Largest victories by runs 

Source: Last Updated: 4-Apr-2018

Largest victories with most wickets & balls remaining 

Source: Last Updated: 3-April-2018

Individual records 2017

Individual records (batting) 2017

Most career runs 2017

Highest career average 2017

Highest career strike rate 2017

Most half-centuries in a career 2017

Most sixes in a career 2017

Most fours in a career 2017

Highest individual scores 2017

Individual records (bowling) 2017

Most career wickets 2017 (minimum 5 wickets)

Best bowling figures 2017 
(Minimum 3 Wickets in an inning)

Best career bowling average 2017 
(Minimum 10 Wickets)

Best career strike rate 2017

Individual records (wicket-keeping) 2017

Most dismissals in career 2017

Individual records (fielding) 2017

Most catches in a career 2017

Individual records 2018

Individual records (batting) 2018

Most career runs 2018

Most centuries in a career 2018

Most half-centuries in a career 2018 (5 half-centuries this year)

Most sixes in a career 2018

Most fours in a career 2018

Highest individual scores 2018

Individual records (bowling) 2018

Most career wickets 2018 (minimum 5 wickets)

Best bowling figures 2018 
(Minimum 3 Wickets in an inning)

Best career bowling average 2018 
(Minimum 10 Wickets)

Best career strike rate 2018

Individual records (wicket-keeping) 2018

Most dismissals in career 2018

Individual records (fielding) 2018

Most catches in a career 2018

All-time records

Most 5 wickets haul

Most 4 wickets haul

Most Hat-Tricks

See also 

 Dhangadhi Premier League
 Everest Premier League
 Nepal national cricket team
 Biratnagar Kings
 Team Chauraha Dhangadhi

References 

Stats
Dhangadhi Premier League
records and statistics